Amélie Mauresmo was the three-time defending champion, but chose not to participate this year.

Justine Henin won the title, defeating Karin Knapp in the final 6–3, 6–3.

Seeds

Draw

Finals

Top half

Bottom half

External links
 Main and Qualifying Draws

References

Diamond Games
Proximus Diamond Games
Proximus